Glendenning is a suburb of Sydney, in the state of New South Wales, Australia. Glendenning or Glendening is also a surname, of Scottish Gaelic origin.

Glendenning may also refer to:

People with the surname

Glendening
 Frances Hughes Glendening, former First Lady of Maryland
 Luke Glendening, American ice hockey player
 Parris Glendening, American politician, Governor of Maryland
 Sarah Glendening, American actress

Glendenning
 Barry Glendenning, Irish sports journalist 
 Bob Glendenning, English footballer 
 Candace Glendenning, English actress
 John M. Glendenning, Canadian politician
 Lionel Glendenning (born 1941), Australian architect
 Maurice L. Glendenning, founder of the House of Aaron religious sect
 Phil Glendenning, Australian refugee advocate, life member of the Refugee Council of Australia
 Raymond Glendenning, BBC radio sports commentator

Other uses
 Kidwell, West Virginia, formerly also known as Glendenning

See also
 Glendinning, a surname
 David Glendenning Cogan, American ophthalmologist (given name)
 Kill Johnny Glendenning, a play